Fundamenta nova theoriae functionum ellipticarum  (New Foundations of the Theory of Elliptic Functions) is a book on Jacobi elliptic functions by Carl Gustav Jacob Jacobi. The book was first published in 1829, and has been reprinted in volume 1 of his collected works and on several later occasions. The book introduces Jacobi elliptic functions and the Jacobi triple product identity.

References
Citations

General

Mathematics books
History of mathematics
Elliptic functions
19th-century Latin books